Holy Transfiguration Monastery of Studite Brethren - monastic complex of Ukrainian Greek Catholic Church in the town of Horodok, Lviv Oblast, Ukraine. Located on the area of the ancient settlement of town's historical origin. The monasteries buildings arose as a result of reconstruction of the former military barracks located in the abandoned XV century Franciscan monastery.

Origin
According to historic sources site was occupied by sacred buildings from time of Principality of Halych. Archaeological excavations and analysis of brickwork confirmed existence of the church from Kievan Rus' time. After the annexation of the lands of the Galician principality by the Polish kings, buildings of the ancient church passed to the Franciscan order. Over time, considering the small number of Roman Catholics and economic problems, the monastery fell into decline. After the inclusion of Halychyna in the Austrian Empire, the monastery was liquidated, and in 80-th of XVIII century, the buildings were transferred to the military. Since then, they have been used as cavalry barracks.

Re-establishment
In 1996 Studite Brethren, began the restoration work. Buildings, that were in an emergency state, were rebuilt. The ancient portions of the original temple were discovered, and the later stages of its reconstruction by the Franciscans were researched. The team led by architect M. Rybenchuk created two reconstruction projects. A project that was implemented provided a reproduction of ancient Rus` imagery based on one of the temples from Pereiaslav. A cylindrical drum was built, reinforced structures and arranged iron-concrete floors over residential buildings. Construction lasted from 1997 to 2002.

References

Eastern Catholic monasteries in Ukraine
Ukrainian Catholic monasteries
Studite Brethren monasteries
Monasteries in Lviv Oblast